The 2022–23 Moldovan Women Top League is the 23rd season of the highest women's football league in Moldova. The competition started on 11 September 2022 and will conclude on 14 May 2023.

Teams

Format
The schedule consists of three rounds. During the first two rounds, each team plays each other once home and away for a total of 10 matches. The pairings of the third round will then be set according to the standings after the first two rounds, giving every team a third game against each opponent for a total of 15 games per team.

League table

Results

Matches 1–10
Teams play each other twice (once home, once away).

Matches 11–15

Teams play every other team once (either at home or away).

References

External links
Women Top League – Moldova – Results, fixtures, tables – FMF

Moldovan Women Top League 2020–21
Moldovan Women Top League seasons
Moldova